In medicine, a Holter monitor (often simply Holter) is a type of ambulatory electrocardiography device, a portable device for cardiac monitoring (the monitoring of the electrical activity of the cardiovascular system) for at least 24 hours.

The Holter's most common use is for monitoring ECG heart activity (electrocardiography or ECG). Its extended recording period is sometimes useful for observing occasional cardiac arrhythmias which would be difficult to identify in a shorter period. For patients having more transient symptoms, a cardiac event monitor which can be worn for a month or more can be used.

The Holter monitor was developed at the Holter Research Laboratory in Helena, Montana, US by experimental physicists Norman J. Holter and Bill Glasscock, who started work on radio telemetry in 1949. Inspired by a suggestion from cardiologist Paul Dudley White in the early 1950s, they redirected their efforts toward development of a wearable cardiac monitoring device. The Holter monitor was released for commercial production in 1962.

When used to study the heart, much like standard electrocardiography, the Holter monitor records electrical signals from the heart via a series of electrodes attached to the chest. Electrodes are placed over bones to minimize artifacts from muscular activity. The number and position of electrodes varies by model, but most Holter monitors employ between three and eight. These electrodes are connected to a small piece of equipment that is attached to the patient's belt or hung around the neck, keeping a log of the heart's electrical activity throughout the recording period. A 12-lead Holter system is used when precise ECG information is required to analyse the exact origin of the abnormal signals.

Data storage 

Older devices used reel-to-reel tapes or a standard C90 or C120 audio cassette and ran at a 1.7 mm/s or 2 mm/s speed to record the data. Once a recording was made, it could be played back and analyzed at 60x speed, so 24 hours of recording could be analyzed in 24 minutes. More modern units record an EDF-file onto digital flash memory devices. The data is uploaded into a computer which then automatically analyzes the input, counting ECG complexes, calculating summary statistics such as average, minimum and maximum heart rate, and finding candidate areas in the recording worthy of further study by the technician.

Components
Each Holter system has hardware (called monitor or recorder) for recording the signal, and software for review and analysis of the record. There may be a "patient button" on the front that the patient can press at specific instants such as on sickness, going to bed, taking pills, etc.; this records a mark that identifies the time of the action on the recording. Advanced Holter recorders are able to display the signal, useful for checking the signal quality.

Recorder

The size of the recorder differs depending on the manufacturer of the device. The average dimensions of today's Holter monitors are about 110x70x30 mm, but some are only 61x46x20 mm and weigh 99 g. Most of the devices operate with two AA batteries.

Most of the Holters monitor the ECG via only two or three channels. Depending on manufacturer, different lead systems and numbers of leads are used; the number of leads may be minimised for patient comfort. Two or three channel recording has been used for a long time in the Holter monitoring history; 12-channel Holters were introduced later, using either the standard 12-lead electrocardiograph or the modified (Mason-Likar) exercise lead system. These Holters can occasionally provide information similar to that of an ECG stress test examination. They are also suitable when analyzing patients after myocardial infarction. Recordings from these 12-lead monitors are of a significantly lower resolution than those from a standard 12-lead ECG, and in some cases have been shown to provide misleading ST segment representation, even though some devices allow setting the sampling frequency up to 1000 Hz for special-purpose examinations such as detection of "late potential".

Another innovation is the inclusion of a triaxial movement sensor, which records the patient's physical activity and, on examination and software processing, extracts three movement statuses: sleeping, standing, or walking. Some modern devices can record spoken patient diary entries that can be listened to.

Analyzing software

After the recording of ECG signal for typically 24 hours, the signal must be analysed. A person would have to listen for the full 24 hours; instead integrated automatic analysis determines different sorts of heart beats, rhythms, etc. The success of the analysis is closely associated with the signal quality, which mainly depends upon the attachment of the electrodes to the patient's body. Incorrect attachment allows electromagnetic disturbance to add noise to the record, particularly with rapid patient movement, impeding processing. Other factors can also affect signal quality, such as muscle tremors, sampling rate and resolution of the digitized signal (high quality devices offer higher sampling frequency).

The automatic analysis commonly provides the physician with information about heart beat morphology, beat interval measurement, heart rate variability, rhythm overview and patient diary (moments when the patient pressed the patient button). Advanced systems also perform spectral analysis, ischemic burden evaluation, graph of patient's activity or PQ segment analysis. Also possible is the ability to monitor and analyse pacemaker impulse detection, useful for checking pacemaker function.

History

The cardiac event monitor has been used for many years. The first devices were not portable; over time they became smaller. Then portable monitors were developed, weighing at first thirty pounds, over the years reducing to a fraction of a pound. Modern holter monitors can have no wires at all but simply a sticky patch attached to patients chest, most widely known are developed by iRhythm (Zio XT), TZ Medical (Trident), Philips BioTel Heart (ePatch) and BardyDx (CAM) among many others.

Gallery

See also
 BodyKom, a heart monitoring service transmitting data via the mobile cellular telephone network

References

External links

 Holter monitor - MedLine Plus
 Holter monitor - Biocalculus

American inventions
Diagnostic cardiology
Medical monitoring equipment